
Year 603 (DCIII) was a common year starting on Tuesday (link will display the full calendar) of the Julian calendar. The denomination 603 for this year has been used since the early medieval period, when the Anno Domini calendar era became the prevalent method in Europe for naming years.

Events 
 
 By place 
 Europe 
 Spring – Witteric, counting on the support of the nobles, attacks the royal palace in Toledo, and overthrows King Liuva II. He cuts off his right hand, and has him executed. Witteric becomes the new king of the Visigoths.
 King Agilulf besieges Cremona, and with the assistance of the Slavs the city is destroyed. He captures Padua and Mantua (Northern Italy); its territory is divided between the Lombard duchies of Brescia and Bergamo.  
 Agilulf, under the influence of his wife Theodelinda, abandons Arianism for Catholicism, and is (with his son Adaloald) baptised in the Cathedral of Monza, where later the Iron Crown of Lombardy is installed.
 The last mention of the Roman Senate is made (according to the Gregorian register). It mentions that the Senate has acclaimed new statues of Emperor Phocas and Empress Leontia.

 Britain 
 Battle of Degsastan: King Æthelfrith of Northumbria defeats the combined forces of the Strathclyde Britons and Scots under Áedán mac Gabráin, establishing the supremacy of the Angles in the northern part of what will become known as the British Isles.

 Asia 
 Emperor Wéndi stabilises the Chinese Empire; the agricultural acreage increases greatly, and shipbuilding technology reaches a new high level.
 Prince Shōtoku of Japan establishes a twelve level cap and rank system, and is said to have authored a seventeen-article constitution.
 Rebellious Göktürks depose and kill the ambitious ruler (khagan) Tardu, of the Western Turkic Khaganate (Central Asia). 
 Heshana Khan succeeds his father Tardu as ruler of the Göktürks, and levies heavy taxes on the Tiele people.

 By topic 
 Religion 
 Schuttern Abbey (Germany) is founded by the wandering Irish monk Offo.
 The future Pope Boniface III is appointed papal legate to Constantinople.

Births 
 Abu al-Aswad al-Du'ali, Muslim scholar (approximate date)
 Dagobert I, king of the Franks (d. 639)
 Li Daozong, prince of the Tang Dynasty (approximate date)
 Li Yuanji, prince of the Tang Dynasty (d. 626)
 Pacal the Great, ruler (ajaw) of Palenque (d. 683)
 Yeon Gaesomun, dictator of Goguryeo (d. 666)

Deaths 
 Fintan of Clonenagh, Irish abbot
 Liuva II, king of the Visigoths (b. 583)
 Mungo, Brythonic bishop (or 614)
 Tardu, ruler (khagan) of the Göktürks

References